Hypodoxa is a genus of moths in the family Geometridae described by Prout in 1912.

Species
 Hypodoxa bryophylla (Goldfinch, 1929)
 Hypodoxa calliglauca (Turner, 1926)
 Hypodoxa conspurcata (Lucas, 1898) (=Pseudoterpna myriosticta Turner, 1904)
 Hypodoxa corrosa (Warren, 1907)
 Hypodoxa deteriorata (Walker, 1860) (=Boarmia nigraria Felder & Rogenhofer, 1875)
 Hypodoxa emiliaria (Guenée, [1858])
Hypodoxa emiliaria emiliaria (Guenée, [1858]) (=Hypochroma assidens Lucas, 1901, Hypochroma aurantiacea Lucas, 1891, Hypochroma subornata Warren, 1896, Pingasa talagi Swinhoe, 1917)
Hypodoxa emiliaria aignanensis Prout, 1916
Hypodoxa emiliaria basinigra (Warren, 1902)
Hypodoxa emiliaria fulgurea Prout, 1913
Hypodoxa emiliaria purpurifera (Warren, 1899)
Hypodoxa emiliaria purpurissata (Lucas, 1901)
Hypodoxa emiliaria subleprosa Prout, 1917
 Hypodoxa erebusata (Walker, 1860) (=Hypochroma erebata Meyrick, 1888)
 Hypodoxa horridata (Walker, [1863])
 Hypodoxa involuta Prout, 1933 (=Hypodoxa involuta perplexa Prout, 1933)
 Hypodoxa leprosa (Warren, 1907)
Hypodoxa leprosa leprosa (Warren, 1907)
Hypodoxa leprosa incarnata Prout, 1913
 Hypodoxa lichenosa (Warren, 1907)
Hypodoxa lichenosa lichenosa (Warren, 1907)
Hypodoxa lichenosa rufomixta Prout, 1913
 Hypodoxa multicolor (Warren, 1899) (=Hypodoxa multicolor circumsepta Prout, 1913)
 Hypodoxa muscosaria (Guenée, [1858])
 Hypodoxa paroptila (Turner, 1906)
 Hypodoxa regina Prout, 1916
Hypodoxa regina regina Prout, 1916
Hypodoxa regina pallida Joicey & Talbot, 1917
 Hypodoxa ruptilinea Prout, 1913
 Hypodoxa viridicoma (Warren, 1899) (=Hypochroma viridicoma interrupta Warren, 1902)

References

External links

Pseudoterpnini
Geometridae genera
Taxa named by Louis Beethoven Prout
Moths described in 1912